Manglayatan University is a private university established in 2006, recognised by University Grants Commission (UGC).  Its campus is located in the city of Aligarh in the Indian state of Uttar Pradesh. The main moto of this university is 'Learn today to lead tomorrow'.

Campuses 
Mangalayatan University camp,
33rd Milestone, (Near Beswan) - 202145 (U.P)

Other centres (Offices) in cities like Aligarh, Khair, Mathura, Ranchi, Agra, and Gwalior.

The university is 33 km from Aligarh, 30 km from Mathura, 35 km from Khair and 29 km from Hathras.

References

External links 
 

Private universities in Uttar Pradesh
Jain universities and colleges
Education in Aligarh district
2006 establishments in Uttar Pradesh
Educational institutions established in 2006